The 2014 Hamilton Tiger-Cats season was the 57th season for the team in the Canadian Football League and their 65th overall. The Tiger-Cats finished in 1st place in the East Division for the first time since 1998 and finished with a 9–9 record. The Tiger-Cats advanced to and lost the Grey Cup game for the second year in a row, this time to the Calgary Stampeders by a score of 20–16.

The team returned to Hamilton after playing one season in Guelph; the team split its games between Ron Joyce Stadium and the new Tim Hortons Field. There were significant delays in the construction of Tim Horton's Field, resulting in delays using the stadium and, subsequently, portions of the venue when it did open, resulting in a reduced seating capacity for the inaugural game against the Toronto Argonauts on Labor Day weekend. The aforementioned delays resulted in a lawsuit that was unresolved for several years thereafter, resulting in missed opportunities to host the Grey Cup Championship.

Offseason

Stadium
The Tiger-Cats played in a brand new stadium for the first time in franchise history, playing at the newly constructed Tim Hortons Field at the site of their old stadium, Ivor Wynne Stadium. Tim Hortons Field was due to be completed by June 30, 2014, and, consequently, the team played their preseason home game at McMaster University's Ron Joyce Stadium. The Tiger-Cats will play their first three regular season games on the road and were scheduled to open Tim Hortons Field in week 5 on July 26, 2014 against the expansion Ottawa Redblacks.

However, on July 7, 2014, the Tiger-Cats announced that the construction of Tim Hortons Field was behind schedule and that the team's first two regular-season home games (later extended to three) would, as a matter of necessity, also be moved to Ron Joyce Stadium. The new stadium, still not yet complete with only 18,000 seats ready for use, opened in time for the Labour Day Classic (again as a matter of necessity because of Ontario University Athletics' tradition that also plays games on Labour Day). The stadium was fully complete by October.

CFL draft
The 2014 CFL Draft took place on May 13, 2014. The Tiger-Cats had six selections in the seven-round draft, but moved up and down in positions due to trades with other clubs. The club acquired an additional second round selection and moved down one spot in the first round after completing a trade with Saskatchewan for Shomari Williams and Josh Bartel. The team then traded both second round selections during the draft for the first round selection they had traded to Saskatchewan. The team also gave up a third round selection for Geoff Tisdale and another sixth round selection. Finally, the Tiger-Cats traded their fourth round selection for fullback Dahrran Diedrick.

Preseason

Regular season

Season standings

Season schedule

Post-season

Schedule

Team

Roster

Coaching staff

References

Hamilton Tiger-Cats seasons
2014 Canadian Football League season by team